Dalila Belén Ippolito (born 24 March 2002) is an Argentine footballer who plays as a midfielder for Serie A club Parma and the Argentina national team.

Club career

In 2015, Ippolito debuted for River Plate at the age of 13.

In August 2020, Ippolito signed for Italian team Juventus. On 30 July 2021, she moved to Pomigliano on loan. She signed for Parma in August 2022.

International career
On 22 May 2019, Ippolito was included in Argentina's squad for the 2019 FIFA Women's World Cup in France. On 24 May 2019, she appeared in a match against Uruguay, which finished as a 3–1 win.

Honours 
 Serie A: 2020–21
 Supercoppa Italiana: 2020

References

External links

 
 
 

2002 births
Living people
Footballers from Buenos Aires
Argentine women's footballers
Argentine people of Italian descent
Women's association football midfielders
Club Atlético River Plate (women) players
UAI Urquiza (women) players
Juventus F.C. (women) players
Argentina women's international footballers
2019 FIFA Women's World Cup players
Pan American Games silver medalists for Argentina
Pan American Games medalists in football
Footballers at the 2019 Pan American Games
Argentine expatriate women's footballers
Argentine expatriate sportspeople in Italy
Expatriate women's footballers in Italy
Medalists at the 2019 Pan American Games
Pomigliano C.F. players
Parma Calcio 2022 players